Bufotoxins are a family of toxic steroid lactones or substituted tryptamines of which some may or may not be toxic. They occur in the parotoid glands, skin, and poison of many toads (genus Bufo) and other amphibians, and in some plants and mushrooms. The exact composition varies greatly with the specific source of the toxin. It can contain 5-MeO-DMT, bufagins, bufalin, bufotalin, bufotenin, bufothionine, dehydrobufotenine, epinephrine, norepinephrine, and serotonin. Some authors have also used the term bufotoxin  to describe the conjugate of a bufagin with suberylarginine.

The toxic substances found in toads can be divided by chemical structure in two groups:

bufadienolides, which are cardiac glycosides (e.g., bufotalin, bufogenin)
tryptamine-related substances (e.g., bufotenin)

Toads known to secrete bufotoxin include the following:

Bufo alvarius
Bufo americanus
Bufo arenarum
Bufo asper
Bufo blombergi
Bufo boreas
Bufo bufo
Bufo bufo gargarizans
Sclerophrys gutturalis (syn. Bufo gutturalis)
Bufo formosus
Bufo fowleri
Rhinella marina (formerly Bufo marinus)
Bufo melanostictus
Bufo peltocephalus
Bufo quercicus
Bufo regularis
Bufo valliceps
Bufo viridis
Bufo vulgaris

Extraction
Extract from the skin of certain Asian toads, such as Bufo bufo gargarizans and Bufo melanostictus, is often found in certain Chinese folk remedies. The Pharmacopoeia of the People's Republic of China (ChP) considers the two species valid sources of toad venom, and requires the dry product to contain at least 6% of cinobufagin and resibufogenin combined by weight. The extract is obtained by squeezing the parotoid glands of caught, washed toads for a white venom and drying; the final dried venom is usually brown, with a chunk or flake form.

Human poisoning
Toad‐venom poisoning is rare but can kill. It can occur when someone drinks toad soup, eats toad meat or toad eggs, or swallows live toads on a bet. It can also happen when someone deliberately takes commercial substances made with toad toxins. These go under names including  "Kyushin", "Chan Su" (marketed as a painkiller, topical anesthetic or cardiac treatment), "Rockhard" and "Love Stone" (marketed as aphrodisiacs).

"Chan Su" (literally "toad venom") is often adulterated with standard painkillers, such as paracetamol, promethazine and diclofenac. It may be ingested or injected.

References

External links 
 Anaxyrus boreas boreas - Boreal Toad, californiaherps.com
 Toad Toxins, erowid.com

Vertebrate toxins